The Elbląg Brewery is a major brewery in Elbląg, Poland. It belongs to the Żywiec Group.

Brewery
The history of the Elbing Brewing Tradition dates back to 1309, when Teutonic Master Siegfried von Leuchtwangen granted brewing privileges to the town of Elbing. The present brewery was founded in 1872 as the Elbinger Aktien-Brauerei. In the early 1900s, the brewery was the exclusive supplier of Pilsner beer to the court of German Emperor Wilhelm II.

After Soviet Communist take-over at the end of WW II, Elbing became the Polish Elbląg (El-blang), and the brewery was reopened as a state-owned enterprise. Following the 1990 collapse of Communism, the brewery's owners Żywiec S.A. and Brewpole BV (Elbląg, Warka, Leżajsk) merged to form Grupa Zywiec S.A..  The Dutch Heineken Group (Heineken International Beheer B.V.) then became a majority shareholder in Grupa Zywiec S.A. with a 61% shareholding.  Harbin B.V., a private investment company and the former owner of Brewpole B.V. owns 36.2% and the remaining shares are publicly traded on the Warsaw Stock Exchange. 

EB beer
"EB" is a brand of beer introduced by Elbląg Brewery in 1993 and marketed toward young consumers.  EB was the top selling brand in Poland in the late 1990s, but fell into decline and was discontinued in the mid-2000s before being revived a decade later. The beer remained on sale in the United States, Germany and other export markets.  According to the Grupa Żywiec website, Elbląg Brewery currently produces the following beer: Specjal Jasny Pełny.

Logo
The Elbląg Brewery's logo features a kangaroo and an emu.

See also
Polish beer
Żywiec Brewery
Leżajsk Brewery
Warka Brewery
Cieszyn Brewery

References

External links  
 Żywiec Group
RateBeer
 

Breweries of Poland
Beer brands of Poland
Elbląg
Heineken subsidiaries
Heineken brands